Rod Monroe (born August 20, 1942) is a Canadian-born American politician who served in the Oregon Senate, representing District 24 in the middle part of Multnomah County, which includes most of eastern Portland and the city of Happy Valley.

Early life and education
Born in McBride, British Columbia, Monroe was raised in Oregon and graduated from Portland's Franklin High School in 1960. He attended college at Warner Pacific University and received bachelor's and master's degrees from Portland State College (now Portland State University) in 1965 and 1969 respectively.

Career 
He became a teacher at Tigard High School in Tigard, Oregon in 1965, teaching history and government and later served on the David Douglas school board.

In 1976, Monroe was elected to the Oregon House of Representatives, representing District 12 in Portland. He served two terms and then was elected to the Oregon Senate in 1980, representing the 7th district in Portland. He was re-elected to a second Senate term in 1984. During this legislative tenure, Monroe was known for sponsoring safety-oriented legislation, such as mandatory seat belt laws, tougher drunk driving legislation, and bans on indoor smoking.

Monroe ran for the Democratic nomination in the 1986 U.S. Senate election in Oregon, but came in second behind Jim Weaver.

In 1988, he lost a close election in the Democratic primary to Oregon House Majority Leader Shirley Gold, who had been elected to Monroe's seat when he was elected to the Senate. In the 1990 Democratic primary, Monroe sought to upset incumbent Judy Bauman for a seat in the Oregon House, but he was narrowly defeated.

In 1992, Monroe was elected to the council of Metro., the regional government for greater Portland. He served three terms, where he advocated for federal funding of light rail projects and the Portland Streetcar, as well as for biking and pedestrian trails such as the Springwater Corridor. In 2004, he was defeated for a fourth term by environmentalist Robert Liberty.

In Oregon's 2006 legislative elections, Monroe was again elected to the Oregon Senate in the District 24 seat vacated by the retiring Frank Shields.

In 2018, Monroe ran for reelection but was defeated in the Democratic primary by former state Representative Shemia Fagan. Fagan ran unopposed in the general election later that year and won the election to become Monroe's successor in the state Senate.

Personal life
Monroe lives in Portland, Oregon with his wife Billie.

References

External links
 Legislative website
 Project VoteSmart biography

Living people
1942 births
Oregon state senators
Members of the Oregon House of Representatives
Politicians from Portland, Oregon
Portland State University alumni
Warner Pacific University alumni
People from the Regional District of Fraser-Fort George
School board members in Oregon
Franklin High School (Portland, Oregon) alumni
21st-century American politicians
Schoolteachers from Oregon